Hoseyn Qeshlaqi may refer to:
 Hoseyn Qeshlaqi Gurabazlu
 Hoseyn Qeshlaqi Hajj Khvajehlu